Atula Thiri Dhamma Dewi was the chief queen consort of King Minkhaung II of Ava. She was a granddaughter of King Mohnyin Thado, as well as a direct descendant of King Swa Saw Ke of Ava from her mother's side.

She was wedded to her cousin Prince Nawrahta (later King Minkhaung II) in 1466/67 by their grandfather King Narapati I of Ava. The couple had been engaged since they were both nine years old (in their 10th year).

Ancestry
The following is her ancestry as reported in the Hmannan Yazawin chronicle.

Notes

References

Bibliography
 
 
 

Chief queens consort of Ava
15th-century Burmese women
16th-century Burmese women